Frazer William Down McLaren (born October 29, 1987) is a Canadian former professional ice hockey left winger who played in National Hockey League (NHL) for the San Jose Sharks and the Toronto Maple Leafs.

Playing career
McLaren played five seasons of junior hockey in the Western Hockey League, mostly for the Portland Winter Hawks, but playing 48 of his 318 games for the Moose Jaw Warriors following a mid-season trade during the 2007–08 season. He was drafted after his fourth year of junior hockey, being taken in the seventh round of the 2007 NHL Entry Draft, 203rd overall.

McLaren played a full season for the Worcester Sharks of the American Hockey League in the 2008–09 season, collecting 181 penalty minutes while being used as an enforcer. Despite missing the cut to make the NHL squad at the beginning of the 2009–10 season, McLaren was recalled to play in the San Jose Sharks' second game, making his NHL debut on October 3, 2009. He also scored his first NHL point, coming on a secondary assist of Benn Ferriero's first NHL goal.

On November 29, 2009, McLaren scored his first NHL goal against Roberto Luongo of the Vancouver Canucks. On June 30, 2011, McLaren signed a one-year contract extension with the San Jose Sharks.

During the 2012–13 season, on January 31, 2013, McLaren was claimed off waivers from the Sharks by the Toronto Maple Leafs.

In July 2013, McLaren signed a two-year contract with the Leafs.

During the 2013–14 season, on March 3, 2014, McLaren was placed on waivers by the Toronto Maple Leafs, well into the first season of his new contract with the Leafs. This move was widely seen as an attempt to free up cap space for the return of Dave Bolland, with the hopes that McLaren will clear waivers and join the Toronto Marlies of the American Hockey League.

On August 24, 2015, McLaren signed a one-year contract with the San Jose Sharks, marking his second tenure with the organization.

Career statistics

References

External links

Hockey's Future prospect profile

1987 births
Living people
Canadian ice hockey left wingers
Moose Jaw Warriors players
Portland Winterhawks players
San Jose Barracuda players
San Jose Sharks draft picks
San Jose Sharks players
Ice hockey people from Winnipeg
Toronto Maple Leafs players
Toronto Marlies players
Worcester Sharks players